Epirranthis diversata is a moth of the family Geometridae. The species was first described by Michael Denis and Ignaz Schiffermüller in 1775. It can be found from central and western Siberia and northern and central Russia to western Europe and from Scandinavia down to the Alps.

The wingspan is 31–45 mm. The moths flies from April to June depending on the location.

The larvae feed on Populus tremula.

References

Fauna Europaea

Oenochrominae
Moths of Europe
Moths of Asia
Taxa named by Michael Denis
Taxa named by Ignaz Schiffermüller
Moths described in 1775